County Mayo was a parliamentary constituency in Ireland, which returned two Members of Parliament (MPs) to the House of Commons of the Parliament of the United Kingdom from 1801 to 1885.

History 
The constituency was created at the Act of Union 1800, replacing the earlier Mayo constituency in the pre-union Parliament of Ireland. Under the Redistribution of Seats Act 1885 it was divided into four new single-seat constituencies: see East Mayo, North Mayo, South Mayo and West Mayo.

Boundaries
This constituency comprised the whole of County Mayo.

Members of Parliament

Elections

The elections in this constituency took place using the first past the post electoral system.

Elections in the 1830s

 

 

 

 

 

 

 

 
 

Browne was elevated to the peerage, becoming 1st Baron Oranmore and causing a by-election.

 
 

 Note (1836): Walker suggests 609 votes were placed for Robert Browne, and none for John Browne, but Stooks Smith's figures have been used above.

 
 

Elections in the 1840s
Brabazon's death caused a by-election.

 

Blake resigned by accepting the office of Steward of the Chiltern Hundreds, causing a by-election.

 

 

 

Elections in the 1850s
Browne's death caused a by-election.

 

 

 
 

On petition, Moore was unseated, causing a by-election.

Elections in the 1860s

Elections in the 1870s
Moore's death caused a by-election.

On petition, Browne and Tighe were unseated.

 

Elections in the 1880s

 

Parnell was also elected MP for Cork City and opted to sit there, causing a by-election.

 Notes 

ReferencesThe Parliaments of England'' by Henry Stooks Smith (1st edition published in three volumes 1844–50), 2nd edition edited (in one volume) by F.W.S. Craig (Political Reference Publications 1973)

Westminster constituencies in County Mayo (historic)
Constituencies of the Parliament of the United Kingdom established in 1801
Constituencies of the Parliament of the United Kingdom disestablished in 1885